Dominator is the debut album by Scottish techno band the Time Frequency, released in 1994. The album reached number 23 on the UK Albums Chart, and No. 7 on the Scottish Albums Chart. In 2017, the album was reissued as a Special Edition double-disc album with bonus tracks on CD1 and remixes, B-sides and demo tracks on CD2. A second album Dominator 2 was released in 2008, 14 years later.

Track listings

Special edition 
In 2017, the album was reissued by Emotiv Records. It appends four bonus tracks to disc 1, as well as including a second disc with B-sides, previously unreleased tracks and demos.

Cover versions
Track 4 is a cover of the theme music to Jurassic Park by John Williams
Track 5 is a cover of "Supernature" by Cerrone
Track 9 is a cover of "Energy Rush" by Suburban Delay
Track 11 is a cover of "Popcorn" by Hot Butter
Track 25 is a cover of "Fade to Grey" by Visage

References

1994 debut albums
The Time Frequency albums